Portland Rose Garden may refer to:

 International Rose Test Garden, a rose garden in Portland, Oregon
 Moda Center, an indoor sports arena in Portland, Oregon formerly known as the Rose Garden